Babbitt is a city in Saint Louis County, Minnesota, United States. As of the 2020 census, the city had a population of 1,462.

Saint Louis County Highway 21 (CR 21) serves as a main route in the community.

History
The city grew out of the formation of a taconite mine built by Armco and Republic Steel starting in 1944. The company town was built near the eastern edge of the Mesabi Iron Range. The city of Silver Bay was built simultaneously along Lake Superior (60 miles to the southeast), and connected by train, for transportation of iron ore to cities along the Great Lakes. Babbitt is named after Judge Kurnal R. Babbitt of New York City. Judge Babbitt, who died on February 15, 1920, was general counsel for and a director of several mining companies. Before removing to New York in 1908, he practiced law in Colorado at Aspen, Cripple Creek and Colorado Springs.

Geography

Demographics

2010 census
As of the census of 2010, there were 1,475 people, 707 households, and 435 families living in the city. The racial makeup of the city was 98.1% White, 0.3% Native American, 0.2% Asian, 0.1% from other races, and 1.3% from two or more races. Hispanic or Latino of any race were 0.1% of the population.

There were 707 households, of which 20.2% had children under the age of 18 living with them, 49.2% were married couples living together, 8.3% had a female householder with no husband present, 4.0% had a male householder with no wife present, and 38.5% were non-families. 34.1% of all households were made up of individuals, and 19.5% had someone living alone who was 65 years of age or older. The average household size was 2.07 and the average family size was 2.60.

The median age in the city was 51.1 years. 17.1% of residents were under the age of 18; 4.3% were between the ages of 18 and 24; 19.1% were from 25 to 44; 28.2% were from 45 to 64; and 31.3% were 65 years of age or older. The gender makeup of the city was 47.9% male and 52.1% female.

2000 census
As of the census of 2000, there were 1,670 people, 735 households, and 530 families living in the city.  The population density was 15.8 people per square mile (6.1/km2).  There were 801 housing units at an average density of 7.6 per square mile (2.9/km2).  The racial makeup of the city was 98.86% White, 0.12% African American, 0.30% American Indian, 0.12% Asian, and 0.60% from two or more races. 20.0% were of German, 16.6% Norwegian, 15.1% Finnish, 6.8% Swedish, 5.8% English and 5.2% Irish ancestry.

There were 735 households, out of which 21.5% had children under the age of 18 living with them, 61.4% were married couples living together, 8.7% had a female householder with no husband present, and 27.8% were non-families. 25.7% of all households were made up of individuals, and 13.9% had someone living alone who was 65 years of age or older.  The average household size was 2.27 and the average family size was 2.67.

In the city, the population was spread out, with 21.0% under the age of 18, 4.4% from 18 to 24, 21.8% from 25 to 44, 24.1% from 45 to 64, and 28.7% who were 65 years of age or older.  The median age was 47 years. For every 100 females, there were 96.7 males.  For every 100 females age 18 and over, there were 94.4 males.

The median income for a household in the city was $33,229, and the median income for a family was $37,137. Males had a median income of $38,214 versus $24,531 for females. The per capita income for the city was $18,853.  About 3.6% of families and 6.1% of the population were below the poverty line, including 8.5% of those under the age of 18 and 1.9% of those 65 and older.

Government

2016 mayor and council members

Mayor Andrea Zupancich

Councilor Terry Switajewski

Councilor Richard Huovinen

Councilor Jim Lassi

Councilor Glenn Anderson

Clerk-Treasurer Cathy Bissonette

Notable athlete

Babbitt is the hometown of William "Buzzy" Schneider. Schneider was a member of the 1976 and 1980 Olympic hockey teams. Known as the "Babbitt Rabbit", Schneider scored the first goal in a 4-3 victory over the Soviet Union in the first game of the gold medal round of the 1980 Winter Olympics hockey tournament. Known as the Miracle on Ice, the game took place in Lake Placid, New York, and is commonly described by sports historians as the greatest upset in sports history.

References

External links

 City of Babbitt, MN – Official Website

Cities in Minnesota
Cities in St. Louis County, Minnesota
Company towns in Minnesota
Mining communities in Minnesota
Populated places established in 1944